Larry Kent Sheets (born December 6, 1959) is an American former Major League Baseball (MLB) outfielder and designated hitter who played for the Baltimore Orioles, Detroit Tigers, and Seattle Mariners from 1984 to 1990 and 1993. He also played one season in Japan for the Yokohama Taiyo Whales in 1992.

Sheets attended Eastern Mennonite University, where he played basketball. He was named to the Old Dominion Athletic Conference's all-conference second team in 1980 and to the first team in 1982. He graduated from Eastern Mennonite in 1984. He was named to Eastern Mennonite's athletic hall of fame in 1988. 

Sheets was selected as the first of the Orioles' four picks in the second round (29th overall) of the 1978 MLB draft, nineteen slots ahead of Cal Ripken Jr. His lack of enthusiasm and commitment to the sport while in the minors frustrated Orioles scouts and officials and was chronicled in an article written by Alexander Wolff in the June 15, 1981 issue of Sports Illustrated. In a 13–11 loss to the Texas Rangers at Memorial Stadium on August 6, 1986 which was the first-ever game in MLB history that featured three grand slams, Sheets and Jim Dwyer each hit one in the fourth inning off Bobby Witt and Jeff Russell respectively. Toby Harrah had hit the first one of the contest off Ken Dixon two innings earlier in the second. After six seasons in Baltimore, Sheets was dealt to the Tigers for Mike Brumley on January 10, 1990 in a transaction where the Orioles sacrificed a much-needed power hitter for a younger, less expensive player.

Sheets had career highs in batting average (.316), home runs (31) and RBIs (94) in 1987.

Sheets used to operate a youth sports facility in Westminster, Maryland, and serves as Gilman School's head Varsity Baseball coach.

He has a son named Gavin who plays for the Chicago White Sox of Major League Baseball (MLB)

References

External links

1959 births
Living people
Major League Baseball left fielders
Major League Baseball right fielders
Baseball players from Virginia
Baltimore Orioles players
Detroit Tigers players
Seattle Mariners players
Hagerstown Suns players
American expatriate baseball players in Japan
Yokohama Taiyō Whales players
People from Staunton, Virginia
College men's basketball players in the United States
Bluefield Orioles players
Charlotte O's players
New Orleans Zephyrs players
Rochester Red Wings players